The annual Van Buren Popcorn Festival is a festival held each August, typically during the 1st or 2nd full Thursday, Friday and Saturday of the month, in Van Buren, Indiana. The festival is held in celebration of the central role of popcorn to the town. As with many small town festivals, Van Buren's focuses on a theme that has meaning to the community. First held in 1973, the Popcorn Festival has become a homecoming event to many "expatriate" residents of this small community.

Since 2020, strict measures are undertaken, such as wearing masks & social distancing.

Schedule 
Whilst the schedule varies each year it usually tends to follow a similar pattern:

Thursday:
 evening: Boy Scouts Popcorn tent opens, serving popped popcorn; centerpiece of the town "midway" of fair booths and kiddie rides
 evening: many food and craft booths
 6:30 p.m. Parade 
hundreds of units participate, including area school bands, civic clubs, first responder volunteers and so forth
a frequent highlight of the parade is antique cars and antique tractors
the 50-year reunion class of the Van Buren High School rides a float in parade each year
 late evening: entertainment on the stage

Friday:
 afternoon and evening: Boy Scouts popcorn tent opens
 afternoon and evening: food and crafts vendors
 late afternoon: children's bicycle parade
 early evening: pet parade
 evening until late: open-air concert downtown

Saturday:
 early morning: volunteer fire department pancake & sausage breakfast
 early morning: "Fun Run" and 5K "Kernel Classic" run
 all day: civic and festival events
Free Cholesterol Testing
food and craft vendors
Fincannon Memorial Car and Motorcycle Show
Cornhole Tournament
 afternoon: Boy Scouts Popcorn Tent 
 afternoon: Children's Biblical Festival at the United Methodist Church Annex
 late afternoon: Baby Parade
 evening until late: open-air concert downtown

References

External links
Festival Home Page
Van Buren, Indiana

Festivals in Indiana
Tourist attractions in Grant County, Indiana